Stanisław Smreczyński (11 July 1899 – 6 April 1975) was the founding father of the Department of Systematic Zoology and Zoogeography of the Jagiellonian University. He was known for his contributions to contemporary understanding of early embryonic development of amphibians and insects as well as his expertise in Pleistocene and extant weevils (Curculionidae).

References

1899 births
1975 deaths
20th-century Polish zoologists
Academic staff of Jagiellonian University
Embryologists